Joan Tower (born September 6, 1938)  is a Grammy-winning contemporary American composer, concert pianist and conductor. Lauded by The New Yorker as "one of the most successful woman composers of all time", her bold and energetic compositions have been performed in concert halls around the world. After gaining recognition for her first orchestral composition, Sequoia (1981), a tone poem which structurally depicts a giant tree from trunk to needles, she has gone on to compose a variety of instrumental works including Fanfare for the Uncommon Woman, which is something of a response to Aaron Copland's Fanfare for the Common Man, the Island Prelude, five string quartets, and an assortment of other tone poems. Tower was pianist and founding member of the Naumburg Award-winning Da Capo Chamber Players, which commissioned and premiered many of her early works, including her widely performed Petroushskates.

Life and career
Born in New Rochelle, New York, in 1938, Tower moved to Bolivia when she was nine years old, an experience which she credits for making rhythm an integral part of her work. For the next decade Tower's talent in music, particularly on the piano, grew rapidly due to her father's insistence that she benefit from consistent musical training. Tower's relationship with her mineralogist father is visible in many aspects of her work, most specifically her "mineral works" including Black Topaz (1976) and Silver Ladders (1986). She returned to the United States as a young woman to study music, first at Bennington College and then at Columbia University where she studied under Otto Luening, Jack Beeson, and Vladimir Ussachevsky and was awarded her doctorate in composition in 1968.

In 1969 Tower, along with violinist Joel Lester and flautist Patricia Spencer, founded the New York-based Da Capo Chamber Players where she served as the group's pianist. Throughout the late 1970s and early 1980s Tower wrote a number of successful works for the Da Capo Players, including Platinum Spirals (1976), Amazon I (1977) and Wings (1981). Though the group won several awards in its early years, including the Naumburg Award in 1973, Tower left the group in 1984, buoyed by the immediate success of her first orchestral composition, Sequoia (1981). In 1972 Tower accepted a faculty position at Bard College in composition, a post she continues to hold today. Tower received a Guggenheim fellowship in 1976.

In 1985, a year after leaving the Da Capo Players, Tower accepted a position at the St. Louis Symphony Orchestra where she was a composer-in-residence until 1988.

Tower became the first woman recipient of the Grawemeyer Award for Music in 1990 for her composition Silver Ladders. In 1993, under commission from the Milwaukee Ballet, Tower composed Stepping Stones, a selection from which she would go on to conduct at the White House. Other compositions from the 1990s include the third Fanfare for the Uncommon Woman, several piano concertos (notably 1996's Rapids (Piano Concerto no. 2) and Tambor (1998) written for the Pittsburgh Symphony Orchestra. In 1999 Tower accepted a position as composer-in-residence with the Orchestra of St. Luke's and in 1998 she won the Delaware Symphony's prestigious Alfred I. DuPont Award for Distinguished American Composer.

In 2002 Tower won the Annual Composer's Award from the Lancaster Symphony. During the 2003–2004 season two new works were debuted, DNA, a percussion quintet commissioned for Frank Epstein, and Incandescent. In 2004 the Nashville Symphony's recording of Tambor, Made in America, and her Concerto for Orchestra earned a Grammy nomination. In 2004 Carnegie Hall's "Making Music" series featured a retrospective of Tower's body of work, performed by artists including the Tokyo String Quartet and pianists Melvin Chen and Ursula Oppens. In 2005 Tower became the first composer commissioned for the "Ford Made in America" program, the only project of its kind to involve smaller-budget orchestras as commissioning agents of new work by major composers, in which her 15-minute Made in America was performed in every state of the union during the 2005–2007 season.  In 2008, Tower's Made in America and the recording of it by the Nashville Symphony conducted by Leonard Slatkin won three Grammy Awards: in the categories Best Orchestral Performance, Best Classical Album and Best Classical Contemporary Composition.

She is currently the Asher B. Edelman Professor of Music at Bard College in Annandale-on-Hudson, New York, as well as a member of the American Academy of Arts and Letters. She also serves on the Artistic Advisory panel of the BMI Foundation.

Work
Tower's early music reflects the influence of her mentors at Columbia University and is rooted in the serialist tradition, whose sparse texture complemented her interest in chamber music. As she developed as a composer Tower began to gravitate towards the work of Olivier Messiaen and George Crumb and broke away from the strict serialist model. Her work became more colorful and has often been described as impressionistic. She often composes with specific ensembles or soloists in mind, and aims to exploit the strengths of these performers in her composition.

Among her most notable work is the six-part Fanfare for the Uncommon Woman, each dedicated to 'women who are adventurous and take risks'. Inspired by Aaron Copland's Fanfare for the Common Man, four of the six parts are scored for 3 trumpets, 4 horns, 3 trombones, tuba and percussion.  The first was debuted in 1987 and conducted by Hans Vonk.  For the second, which premiered in 1989, Tower added one percussion while the third, debuted in 1991 was scored for a double brass quintet. The fourth and sixth are scored for full orchestra. The fifth part was commissioned for the Aspen Music Festival in 1993 and was written specifically for Joan W. Harris. The first five parts were added to the National Recording Registry in 2014.

Works list

Ballet
Stepping Stones (1993), commissioned by the Milwaukee Ballet
Choreographed by Kathryn Posin

Orchestral
Sequoia (1981)
commissioned by the Jerome Foundation for the American Composers Orchestra, who gave the work's première with Dennis Russell Davies conducting in New York City
Music for Cello and Orchestra (1984)
written for André Emelianoff
Island Rhythms (1985)
commissioned by the Florida Orchestra (with a grant from the Lincoln Properties Company), who gave the work's première under Irwin Hoffman on 29 June 1985.
Concerto for Piano (Homage to Beethoven) (1985), for piano and orchestra
co-commissioned by the Hudson Valley Philharmonic, the Saint Paul Chamber Orchestra and the Philharmonia Virtuosi, with a grant from the National Endowment for the Arts.
Silver Ladders (1986)
commissioned by the Saint Louis Symphony, and dedicated to Leonard Slatkin, who conducted the première. The work was a prize winner in the 1988 Kennedy Center Friedheim Awards, and in 1990 won the prestigious Grawemeyer Award.
Clarinet Concerto (1988), for clarinet and orchestra
commissioned by the Naumburg Foundation for clarinettist Charles Neidich, who gave the work's première with the American Symphony Orchestra under Jorge Mester in 1988
Flute Concerto (1989), for flute and orchestra
written for Carol Wincenc, who gave the work's première.
Island Prelude (1989), for oboe and string orchestra
written for oboist Peter Bowman, who premièred the work with the Saint Louis Symphony under Leonard Slatkin on 4 May 1989.
Concerto for Orchestra (1991)
co-commissioned by the Chicago Symphony, the Saint Louis Symphony and the New York Philharmonic.
Fanfare for the Uncommon Woman (1987–1992)
commissioned by Absolut Vodka for the Houston Symphony, the New York Philharmonic, the Orchestra of St. Luke's and the Kansas City Symphony. The world première was given by the Houston Symphony with Hans Vonk conducting.
Violin Concerto (1992), for violin and orchestra
commissioned by the Snowbird Institute and the Barlow Endowment
Stepping Stones (1993)
commissioned by the Milwaukee Ballet
Duets (1994), for chamber orchestra
written for the Los Angeles Chamber Orchestra
Paganini Trills (1996)
premièred in Powell Symphony Hall, Saint Louis on 19 May 1996.
Rapids (Piano Concerto No. 2) (1996), for piano and orchestra
commissioned by the University of Wisconsin for pianist Ursula Oppens
Tambor (1998)
commissioned by Mariss Jansons and the Pittsburgh Symphony, who gave the work's première on 7 May 1998.
The Last Dance (2000)
written for the Orchestra of St. Luke's, who premièred the work under Alan Gilbert (conductor) at Carnegie Hall, New York City on 24 February 2000.
Fascinating Ribbons (2001), for concert band
commissioned by the College Band Directors National Association and was given its première at the CBDNA Conference in 2001.
Strike Zones (2001), concerto for percussion and orchestra
written for Evelyn Glennie and the National Symphony Orchestra, who gave the work's première under Leonard Slatkin at the Kennedy Center, Washington D.C. in October 2001.
In Memory (2002), for string orchestra
transcription of a string quartet Tower wrote for the Cavani String Quartet
Made in America (2004), for chamber orchestra
commissioned by Ford Made in America in partnership with the League of American Orchestras and Meet the Composer, for a consortium of over 60 amateur orchestras across the United States. The world première was given by the Glens Falls Symphony Orchestra in October 2005.
Purple Rhapsody (2005), concerto for viola and chamber orchestra
co-commissioned by the Omaha Symphony Orchestra, the Buffalo Philharmonic, the Virginia Symphony, the Kansas City Symphony, the ProMusica Chamber Orchestra (Columbus), the Peninsula Music Festival Orchestra (Door County, Wisconsin), and the Chautauqua Symphony Orchestra, with a grant from the Serge Koussevitzky Music Foundation in the Library of Congress. The work was premièred by the violist Paul Neubauer (to whom the work is dedicated) and the Omaha Symphony Orchestra in 2005.
Chamber Dance (2006), for chamber orchestra
written for the Orpheus Chamber Orchestra, who premièred the work at Carnegie Hall on May 6, 2006.
Stroke (2010)
commissioned by the Pittsburgh Symphony, who premièred the work under Manfred Honeck on 13 May 2011 at Heinz Hall, Pittsburgh, Pennsylvania.
Red Maple (2013), for bassoon and string orchestra
premiered by Peter Kolkay, bassoon, with the South Carolina Philharmonic under Morihiko Nakahara on 4 October 2013.

Chamber
Breakfast Rhythms I. and II. (1974), for clarinet solo, flute, percussion, violin, cello and piano
Black Topaz (1976), for flute, clarinet, trumpet, trombone, piano and two percussion
Amazon I. (1977), for flute, clarinet, violin, cello and piano
Petroushskates (1980), for flute, clarinet, violin, cello and piano
Noon Dance (1982), for flute, clarinet, percussion, piano, violin and cello
Fantasy... Harbour Lights (1983), for clarinet and piano
Snow Dreams (1983), for flute and guitar
Fanfare for the Uncommon Woman (1986), for eleven brass and three percussion
Island Prelude (1989), for oboe solo and string quartet/quintet or wind quintet
Second Fanfare for the Uncommon Woman (1989), for eleven brass and three percussion
Third Fanfare for the Uncommon Woman (1991), for brass dectet
Celebration Fanfare (1993), for eleven brass and three percussion
Elegy (1993), for trombone solo and string quartet
Fifth Fanfare for the Uncommon Woman (1993), for four trumpets
Night Fields (String Quartet No. 1) (1994), for string quartet
Très lent (Hommage à Messiaen) (1994), for cello and piano
Turning Points (1995), for clarinet and string quartet
And...they're off (1997), for piano trio
Rain Waves (1997), for violin, clarinet and piano
Toccanta (1997), for oboe and harpsichord
Big Sky (2000), for piano trio
In Memory (String Quartet No. 2 (2002), for string quartet
Incandescent (String Quartet No. 3) (2003), for string quartet
For Daniel (2004), for piano trio
DNA (2005), for percussion quintet
A Little Gift (2006), for flute and clarinet
Copperwave (2006), for brass quintet
A Gift (2007), for flute, clarinet, bassoon, horn and piano
Trio Cavany (2007), for piano trio
Angels (String Quartet No. 4) (2008), for string quartet
Dumbarton Quintet (2008), for piano quintet
Rising (2009), for flute and string quartet
White Granite (2010), for piano quartet
17-minute work, co-commissioned by the St Timothy's Summer Music Festival, Montana, the Bravo! Vail Valley Music Festival, Colorado, and the LaJolla Music Society for SummerFest, California. Premièred in Georgetown Lake, Montana on 11 July 2010.
White Water (String Quartet No. 5) (2011), for string quartet, commissioned for the Daedalus Quartet by Chamber Music Monterey Bay.

Vocal
Can I (2007), for S.S.A.A. choir and percussionist
written for the Young People's Chorus of New York City, who premièred the work under Francisco J. Nuñez at the Miller Theater, New York City on 27 April 2008.

Solo
Circles (1964), for piano
Fantasia (1966), for piano
Platinum Spirals (1976), for violin
Red Garnet Waltz (1977), for piano
Wings (1981), for clarinet or alto saxophone
Clocks (1985), for guitar
Or like a...an engine (1994), for piano
Ascent (1996), for organ
Holding a Daisy (1996), for piano
Valentine Trills (1996), for flute
Wild Purple (1998), for viola
Vast Antique Cubes/Throbbing Still (2000), for piano
Simply Purple (2008), for viola
Ivory and Ebony (2009), for piano
For Marianne (2010), for flute
String Force (2010), for violin
Steps (2011), for piano
Purple Rush  (2016), for viola

Interviews
Joan Tower interviewed by Michael Schell, July 22, 2021 on Radio Eclectus, KHUH-LP
At 80, Joan Tower Says Great Music Comes ‘in the Risks’, New York Times, November 9th 2018, by William Robin
Joan Tower interview by Bruce Duffie, April, 1987
Private Interview with Joan Tower, February 23, 1988, Saint Louis, MO, in "An Analysis of Joan Tower's Wings for Solo Clarinet", August 1992, by Nancy E. Leckie Bonds
Private Interview with Joan Tower, May 21, 1988, Saint Louis, MO, in "An Analysis of Joan Tower's Wings for Solo Clarinet", August 1992,  by Nancy E. Leckie Bonds,

 The composer in conversation with Bruce Duffie, published in New Music Connoisseur Magazine, Spring, 2001.

Discography
 Big Sky: Chamber Music of American Women Composers  White Pine WPM202
 Cantos Desiertos / BEASER / TOWER / LIEBERMANN  Naxos – Catalogue No:8.559146
 Chamber and Solo Music Naxos – Catalogue No:8.559215 Chamber Music, Instrumental
 Silver Ladders / Island Prelude / Sequoia Naxos – Catalogue No:FECD-0025
 TOWER: Made in America / Tambor / Concerto for Orchestra Naxos – Catalogue No: 8.559328
 WORLD PREMIERE COLLECTION Naxos-  Catalogue No: FECD-0032

References

Further reading
Jeoung, Ji-Young. An analysis of Joan Tower's solo keyboard works. 2009.

External links
G. Schirmer: Joan Tower Biography
Environmental Themes: Joan Tower 
NewMusicBox cover: Joan Tower in conversation with Frank J. Oteri, September 15, 2005 (includes video)

Listening
Art of the States: Joan Tower Petroushskates (1980)

1938 births
Living people
20th-century classical composers
21st-century classical composers
American women classical composers
American classical composers
Bard College faculty
Grammy Award winners
Members of the American Academy of Arts and Letters
Musicians from New Rochelle, New York
Pupils of Darius Milhaud
21st-century American composers
20th-century American women musicians
20th-century American composers
21st-century American women musicians
20th-century women composers
21st-century women composers
Classical musicians from New York (state)